Euteleuta is a genus of beetles in the family Cerambycidae, containing the following species:

 Euteleuta fimbriata Bates, 1885
 Euteleuta laticauda Bates, 1885
 Euteleuta venezuelensis Breuning, 1971

References

Apomecynini
Cerambycidae genera